Ashbel Green (July 6, 1762 – May 19, 1848) was an American Presbyterian minister and academic.

Biography
Born in Hanover Township, New Jersey, Green served as a sergeant of the New Jersey militia during the American Revolutionary War, and went on to study with Dr. John Witherspoon and graduate as valedictorian from the College of New Jersey, known since 1896 as Princeton University, in 1783. Green later became the third Chaplain of the United States House of Representatives from 1792 to 1800, the eighth President of Princeton University, from 1812 to 1822 (and highly unpopular, due to what many students saw as his heavy-handed leadership style), and the second President of the Bible Society at Philadelphia (now known as the Pennsylvania Bible Society) after having been one of its founding members in 1808.

Green was elected a member of the American Philosophical Society in 1789 and the American Antiquarian Society in 1814.

He emancipated his family's slave Betsey Stockton in 1817, taught her and recommended her as a missionary to the American Board of Commissioners for Foreign Missions, making her the first single female overseas missionary.  He also published a periodical entitled the Christian Advocate.

Green married Elizabeth Stockton on November 3, 1785. They had three children: Robert Stockton Green (1787–1813), Jacob Green (1790–1841), and James Sproat Green (1792–1862), the latter of whom served as U.S. Attorney for the District of New Jersey and was the father of Robert Stockton Green (1831–1895), Governor of New Jersey. After his first wife died in January 1807, he married Christina Anderson in October 1809. They had one child: Ashbel Green, Jr. (b. 1811).

Ashbel Green died in Philadelphia, Pennsylvania on May 19, 1848.

Archival collections
The Presbyterian Historical Society in Philadelphia has a collection of Ashbel Green's original papers, including sermons and correspondence.

Notes

External links

Princeton University biography

1762 births
1848 deaths
Chaplains of the United States House of Representatives
New Jersey militiamen in the American Revolution
People from Hanover Township, New Jersey
Presidents of Princeton University
Princeton University alumni
Presbyterian Church in the United States of America ministers
People of colonial New Jersey
Members of the American Antiquarian Society